Haido may refer to:

Haito, a 9th-century Christian monk and Bishop of Basel
Haido, a township in Xiapu County, Ningde, Fujian, People's Republic of China
Haido, a character in the anime film Naruto the Movie: Legend of the Stone of Gelel

People with the given name
Haido Alexouli (born 1991), Greek long jumper